Geum albiflorum  is a plant in the rose family, Rosaceae family, found in the Auckland Islands.

Description 
Geum albiflorum is a rosette forming herb, with kidney-shaped leaves which are 2–3 cm long and minutely lobed or crenate. The leaves are hairy and rough on below, with silky hairs on the upper side. It flowers in racemes, subtended by bracteoles. The petals are white, and just fractionally longer than the calyx.

Habitat 
It is found on cliff faces and on rock covered ground.

Conservation status
In both 2009 and 2012 it was deemed to be "At Risk - Naturally Uncommon" under the New Zealand Threat Classification System, and this New Zealand classification was reaffirmed in 2018, with the further comments that its range is restricted and it is an island endemic.

References

albiflorum
Flora of New Zealand
Plants described in 1844